Jules Podell (March 5, 1899 – September 27, 1973) was a former nightclub operator who ran the Copacabana nightclub in New York City. Although it was opened in 1940 by Monte Proser, Podell was put in place by mob boss Frank Costello, Proser's partner. By 1950 Podell was making all the decisions and Proser was gone. Podell ran the club until he died in 1973.

His daughter, Mickey Podell-Raber, has written a book of stories and photographs about her father and life at the famous club.

References

Further reading
 
 

1899 births
1973 deaths
Nightclub owners